Rush Creek is a stream in eastern Marin County, California, United States.  It originates on the north edge of Novato, California and flows  northeasterly through wetlands into Black John Slough and then the Petaluma River. The name is associated with Peter Rush who bought land near Novato in 1862.

Ecology
The creek flows through coastal saltwater marsh and coastal brackish-water marsh habitats. The wetlands provide suitable habitat for San Pablo song sparrow, California black rail, saltmarsh common yellowthroat, California brackishwater snail, and California clapper rail.

Conservation
In 1999, the Rush Creek/Cemetery Marsh Enhancement Project was completed by the Marin Audubon Society.  This project involved the excavation of channels to improve circulation and replacement of tide gates in the  Rush Creek marsh and  Cemetery Marsh.  Both marshes are managed by Marin County Open Space District as natural preserves.

See also
List of watercourses in the San Francisco Bay Area

References

External links

Rivers of Marin County, California
Rivers of Northern California
Tributaries of the Petaluma River